"Love Can Move Mountains" is a song by Canadian singer Celine Dion, recorded for her second English-language studio album, Celine Dion (1992). Written by Diane Warren and produced by Ric Wake, it was released as the fourth single in October 1992. It is an up-tempo pop song drawing influence from gospel and dance music, and its lyrics detail the abilities that love has as an emotion. "Love Can Move Mountains" was later included on Dion's greatest hits albums, All the Way... A Decade of Song in 1999 and My Love: Ultimate Essential Collection in 2008.

Commercial performance
"Love Can Move Mountains" was a hit on the club charts in the US, reaching number five on the Billboard Hot Dance Club Play chart. The single hit number two in Canada and reached number 36 on the Billboard Hot 100 in the US. It enjoyed a moderate success in the rest of the world.

The B-side, an unreleased track "Cry Just a Little", produced by Ric Wake, and written by the songwriting team of Lotti Golden and Tommy Faragher, is a cover of a song from E. G. Daily's 1989 album Lace Around the Wound. It is the second cover of Daily that Dion recorded as in 1987 she did a French adaptation of "Love in the Shadows" called "Délivre-moi".

"Love Can Move Mountains" was remixed for the clubs by Tommy Musto (Tommy Musto's 7" Edit, Club Mix, Underground Vocal Mix, Underground Instrumental, Club Dub, Underground Dub), Ric Wake and Richie Jones (Wake & Jones Dub), and by Daniel Abraham (Daniel Abrahams 7" Edit).

"Love Can Move Mountains" (Club Mix) won the Juno Award for Dance Recording of the Year and the original version was nominated for the Juno Award for Single of the Year.

Critical reception
AllMusic editor Jose F. Promis gave the song three out of five stars, noting that there are two remixed radio edits of "Love Can Move Mountains", "one bouncy and the other sleek, and two housey club versions, similar to most dance music from the early '90s in that it seemed to possess a since-lost elegance and a since-lost innocence". Another editor, Stephen Thomas Erlewine, named the song a standout, along with "If You Asked Me To" and "Beauty and the Beast". Larry Flick from Billboard complimented it as a "delicious, gospel-influenced pop/dance anthem with open arms" and a "uplifting, rousing gem". He noted that Dion "takes advantage of the opportunity to cut loose with a big, belted vocal-though she wisely keeps her usual penchant for melodrama down to a minimum". Randy Clark from Cashbox felt the "upbeat, gospel-flavored" single "proves once again this Canadian import is a force to be reckoned with in the '90s." He added, "Celine is now expanding her commerciality with this soulful, yet danceable track on which she is backed with a rich choir." 

Chicago Tribune editor Jan DeKnock called it "an effective journey into gospel". Dave Sholin from the Gavin Report wrote that producer Ric Wake is best known for his work with Taylor Dayne, "but this time he adds just the right edge to Celine Dion's powerful vocal approach. It's evident that she was pouring every ounce of emotion possible into this Diane Warren song, giving it a gospel-like quality. Since she's best known for her stirring ballads, "Love Can Move Mountains" will acquaint the public with yet another side to this wonderfully gifted and very versatile songstress". A reviewer from Music & Media called it a "gospel-framed song set to modern beats". Parry Gettelman from Orlando Sentinel felt that Dion "really excels", on a dance track "in the Lisa Stansfield mold".

Music video
The accompanying music video for "Love Can Move Mountains", which shows Dion singing the song in a county fair, was made for the Daniel Abraham's 7" edit, by director Jeb Brian and released in November 1992. It appeared on Dion's DVD video collection All the Way… A Decade of Song & Video (2001).

Live performances
"Love Can Move Mountains" has been a part of every one of Dion's tours since 1992. Dion performed this song also five nights a week during her show A New Day... at Caesars Palace, Las Vegas and during her BST Hyde Park concert in London on 5 July 2019.

Dion performed the song during the halftime show at the 1992 Grey Cup game in Toronto.

Live versions of "Love Can Move Mountains" can be found on the 1994 À l'Olympia CD,  the Taking Chances World Tour: The Concert DVD/CD, and the Céline une seule fois / Live 2013 DVD/CD.

In 1998, Dion re-recorded "Love Can Move Mountains" with a gospel group God's Property, for the soundtrack of the popular CBS-TV drama Touched by an Angel. She also appeared as herself on one episode of the series, titled Psalm 151, and performed the song.

Track listing

Australian cassette and CD single
"Love Can Move Mountains" (Remix) – 4:04
"Cry Just a Little" –  4:29
"Love Can Move Mountains" (Club Mix) – 5:30
"Love Can Move Mountains" (Wake & Jones Dub) – 5:41
"Love Can Move Mountains" (Underground Dub) – 5:35

Canadian casssette, European 7" and CD, Japanese 3", US 7" and cassette single
"Love Can Move Mountains" (Remix) – 4:04
"Cry Just a Little" – 4:29

Canadian and US 12" single
"Love Can Move Mountains" (Club Mix) – 5:30
"Love Can Move Mountains" (Underground Vocal Mix) – 7:10
"Love Can Move Mountains" (Wake & Jones Dub) – 5:41
"Love Can Move Mountains" (Club Dub) – 5:30
"Love Can Move Mountains" (Underground Dub) – 5:35
"Unison" (Mainstream Mix) – 7:15

European CD single
"Love Can Move Mountains" (Remix) – 4:04
"Love Can Move Mountains" (Club Mix) – 5:30
"Cry Just a Little" – 4:29

European and UK 12" single
"Love Can Move Mountains" (Club Mix) – 5:30
"Love Can Move Mountains" (Underground Vocal Mix) – 7:10
"Love Can Move Mountains" (Underground Instrumental) – 4:38
"Love Can Move Mountains" (Club Dub) – 5:30
"Love Can Move Mountains" (Underground Dub) – 5:35
"Love Can Move Mountains" (Wake & Jones Dub) – 5:41

UK 7" and cassette single
"Love Can Move Mountains" (Remix) – 4:04
"Beauty and the Beast" – 3:57

UK CD single
"Love Can Move Mountains" (Remix) – 4:04
"Love Can Move Mountains" (Club Mix) – 5:30
"Cry Just a Little" – 4:29
"Beauty and the Beast" – 3:57

US CD single
"Love Can Move Mountains" (Daniel Abraham 7" Edit) – 4:05
"Love Can Move Mountains" (Tommy Musto 7" Edit) – 4:10
"Love Can Move Mountains" (Club Mix) – 5:30
"Love Can Move Mountains" (Underground Vocal Mix) – 7:10
"(If There Was) Any Other Way" (Remix) – 5:39
"Unison" (Mainstream Mix) – 7:15

Charts

Weekly charts

Year-end charts

Release history

See also
Juno Award for Dance Recording of the Year

References

External links

1992 singles
1992 songs
Celine Dion songs
Columbia Records singles
Dance-pop songs
Epic Records singles
Juno Award for Dance Recording of the Year recordings
Song recordings produced by Ric Wake
Songs written by Diane Warren